Sinoflustridae is a family of bryozoans belonging to the order Cheilostomatida.

Genera:
 Membraniporopsis Liu, 1999
 Sinoflustra Liu & Yang, 1995

References

Cheilostomatida